The shooting of Datuk Ong Teik Kwong occurred on 1 December 2016, on Tun Dr Lim Chong Eu Expressway, Penang, Malaysia. Datuk Ong, a 32 year old businessman, was driving his car to Penang with his bodyguard and a passenger. The bodyguard, Ja'afar Halid, pulled out his gun and shot Ong. Ja'afar Halid's subsequent shooting also accidentally hit seven people at the scene, resulting in two more deaths and four injured.

Background 
Datuk Ong Teik Kwong was a 32 year old businessman and was the chairman of Persatuan Kebajikan Amal CK One. Police also identified Datuk Ong as the deputy leader of Gang 24 in Penang. Datuk Ong's bodyguard, Ja'afar Halid who was believed to be mentally unstable, was on his first day at work when the shooting happened.

Shooting 
At about 19:30 MYT (11:30 UTC), on route to Penang in a car, Ong and his business partner, Lim Boon Leng were seated at the front while Ja'afar Halid was seated behind. Ja'afar Halid had an argument with Ong and subsequently shot Ong in the head from behind. The car Ong was driving crashed into several vehicles in front. As the car stopped, Lim Boon Leng panicked as the bodyguard then targeted him and ran out of the car with Ja'afar Halid chasing. Ja'afar Halid shot at Lim multiple times. All the 17 shots missed Lim, but resulted in two other deaths and four people injured. Later, Lim managed to get a ride from a female driver who dropped him at a petrol kiosk. Lim then called his friend to send him to the Penang hospital.

Casualties 
A 28 year old RTM cameraman, Muhamad Amirul Amin Amir, was shot in the chest and was sent to the hospital immediately. Another victim was a 38 year old TNB assistant manager, Nurul Huda Abdul Aziz, 33 year old doctor, Arivarni Krishnann, a 32 year old banker, Poh Bee Joo, and a 56 year old factory worker, Lee Hong Boon. The dead were identified as Choi Hon Ming, a 32 year old children's entertainer, and Senthil Murugaiah, a 38 year old florist.

Aftermath

Arrests and investigation 
Ja'afar Halid was arrested at the scene and Lim was later detained. The Malaysian police carried out investigation under Section 302 of the Malaysia Penal Code for murder. Halid and Lim were remanded a total of seven days to facilitate investigations. Police closed parts of Dr Lim Chong Eu Expressway for the forensics team to carry out investigations on 7 December 2016 between 10:30 and 17:00.

Charges 
Ja'afar Halid faced three charges for murder, five attempted murders and causing hurt with a weapon. Ja'afar Halid was charged under Section 302 of the Malaysian Penal, Section 307 which is an attempt to murder and Section 324 which is voluntarily causing hurt with a weapon. Judge of the Sessions Court, Honorable Roslan Hamid, advised Halid to engage counsel through the National Legal Aid Foundation as Ja'afar Halid could not afford one. Ja'afar Halid denied trying to kill the bystanders and injuring Lim Boon Leng.

On 16 December 2020, Ja'afar Halid was sentenced to death after being found guilty for the murder of Datuk Ong Teik Kwong.

References 

2016 in Malaysia
Ong Teik Kwong
Ong Teik Kwong
Ong Teik Kwong
December 2016 events in Malaysia